Johann Neethling Fouché (born 10 January 1993) is a South African rugby union player for the  in Super Rugby and  in the Currie Cup and in the Rugby Challenge. His regular position is tighthead prop.

Career

Youth

In 2009, he once again represented the Leopards, this time for their Under-16 Grant Khomo Week side.

In 2010, however, he moved to Bloemfontein to complete his schooling at Grey College in Bloemfontein. His provincial selection continued at his new school and he represented the Free State in the Under-18 Craven Week tournaments in both 2010 and 2011. In 2010, he was included in a South African Under-18 High Performance squad that played matches against France, England and Namibia.

Blue Bulls

He appeared in seven of the  side's matches during the 2012 Under-19 Provincial Championship and represented the s on three occasions during the 2013 Under-21 Provincial Championship, playing as a loosehead prop instead of his regular tighthead side.

In 2014, he was included in the  side that played in the 2014 Varsity Cup competition, where he made a single appearance for the Pretoria-based university side against eventual champions . He made his first class debut two weeks later on 8 March 2014, playing off the bench in the ' 2014 Vodacom Cup First Round match against , with his side suffering a 24–26 loss.

References

South African rugby union players
Living people
1993 births
People from Rustenburg
South African people of French descent
Rugby union props
Blue Bulls players
Western Province (rugby union) players
White South African people
Stormers players
Cheetahs (rugby union) players
Rugby union players from North West (South African province)